Faustus of Byzantium (also Faustus the Byzantine) was an Armenian historian of the 5th century. Faustus' History of the Armenians (also known as Buzandaran Patmut'iwnk') exists in four "books", beginning with Book 3 ("Beginning") and ending with Book 6 ("Ending"), which appears to be due to the work of a later editor of the surviving manuscript. The History describes events from the military, socio-cultural and political life of 4th-century Armenia. Pavstos describes in detail the reigns of Arsaces (Arshak) II and his son Papas (Pap), and portrays the Mamikonians as defenders par excellence of Armenia. 

The identity of Pavstos and the referent of Buzand remain unsolved. Buzand is either interpreted as meaning "the Byzantine" or, alternatively, "composer of epics". If the latter interpretation is true, then Buzandaran could be translated as "Epic Histories." Faustus' ostensible Byzantine origin was placed under doubt by another early Armenian historian, Ghazar Parpetsi, who believed that the history attributed to Faustus was of too low quality to have been produced by someone educated in Byzantium. This view was shared by most later Armenian historians. Scholars have long speculated about Faustus' ethnic background (whether he was Armenian, Greek or of another ethnicity) and the original language of his History.

Notes

Bibliography

Primary

Secondary
 Ferguson, Everett; McHugh, Michael P.; Norris, Frederick W. (1990). Encyclopedia of Early Christianity. New York: Garland Publishing.
 
 .

External links
 
 
English translation of the History of the Armenians


5th-century Armenian historians
Byzantine people of Armenian descent